The London Borough of Hammersmith and Fulham is a London borough in West London and which also forms part of Inner London. The borough was formed in 1965 from the merger of the former Metropolitan Boroughs of Hammersmith and Fulham. The borough borders Brent to the north, the Royal Borough of Kensington and Chelsea to the east, Wandsworth to the south, Richmond upon Thames to the south west, and Hounslow and Ealing to the west.

Traversed by the east–west main roads of the A4 Great West Road and the A40 Westway, many international corporations have offices in the borough. The local council is Hammersmith and Fulham London Borough Council. The borough is amongst the four most expensive boroughs for residential properties in the United Kingdom, along with Kensington and Chelsea, the City of Westminster and Camden.

The borough is unique in London in having three professional football clubs: Chelsea, Fulham and Queens Park Rangers.

History
The borough origins are in the Ancient Parish of Fulham which goes back to at least the early 12th-century. Hammersmith was a chapelry within Fulham until it became an independent parish in 1631. The manor (estate) of Fulham can be traced back to the seventh century when it was granted to the Bishop of London.

The borough was formed in 1965 by merging the Metropolitan Borough of Hammersmith and the much more ancient Metropolitan Borough of Fulham. It was known as the "London Borough of Hammersmith" until its name was changed on 1 January 1979 by the borough council. The two had been joined together previously in the parish of Fulham until 1834 as the hamlet of Hammersmith had no church until much later. They were joined together again under the Fulham District from 1855 to 1886.

Fulham saw industrialisation and urbanisation from the start of the 19th-century, with the establishment of the world's first energy utility company, at Sands End in 1824, followed by road and rail transport development to the east of the borough. Vacant land by the new railway sidings on the boundary with Kensington and Chelsea London Borough Council led to the development of the Earls Court Exhibition Centre, visited by Queen Victoria in 1879 when she attended Bill Cody's Wild West Show at West Brompton. There followed numerous international fairs and exhibitions for a century until the construction of Earls Court II in the borough in the 1980s. This was dismantled by developers in 2015.

At the other end of today's borough, in 1908, the Franco-British Exhibition and Olympic Games were hosted in Hammersmith, at White City, but the site then took many decades to be redeveloped. In 1960, the BBC opened the BBC Television Centre, and in 2008, Westfield London, a large development with new transport links and a shopping centre.

Districts
The borough includes the areas:
 Brook Green
 Chelsea Harbour (adjoining Chelsea)
 College Park (adjoining Kensal Green)
 East Acton (adjoining London Borough of Ealing)
 Fulham
 Hammersmith
 Old Oak Common (adjoining Harlesden)
 Parsons Green
 Sands End
 Shepherd's Bush
 Walham Green
 West Kensington 
 White City

see also parks and open spaces in Hammersmith and Fulham

Political control
Since 1964 political control of the council has been held by the following parties:

Demographics

According to the 2001 census Hammersmith and Fulham has a population of 165,242. 60% of the borough's population is White British, 20% white non-British (among which are large French, Polish, Portuguese and Irish communities), 5% black Caribbean, 8% black African with various other ethnicities (including Indian, Pakistani, Bangladeshi and Chinese) making up the remaining 11 percent.

The borough has the second-highest proportion of single adults of any borough in England and Wales (55%), and a higher than average proportion for the London area of young adults aged 20–29 (24%).

Around 50% of households are owner–occupiers, and 22% of households were listed as "other" – that is, not single persons living alone or families. These are generally two or more unrelated adults living together, such as students or cohabiting couples.

The borough comprises a patchwork of extremely affluent as well as some less affluent neighbourhoods; The areas of Fulham, Parsons Green, Brackenbury Village, Brook Green, Ravenscourt Park and the Riverside compose of highly expensive Victorian and Edwardian houses, contrasting to the areas of White City and Shepherd's Bush. The unemployment rate is well below average at under 5%, although of these, 29% were listed as long-term unemployed.

See external links below for more census information from the borough.

Ethnicity

Religion

The following shows the religious identity of residents residing in Hammersmith and Fulham according to the 2001, 2011 and the 2021 censuses.

Economy
Sony Mobile Communications has its headquarters in the borough.

Iberia operates the Iberia House in the borough. All Nippon Airways operates the London Office on the fourth floor of Hythe House. South African Airways has its United Kingdom office in the South African Airways House. CE Europe, a subsidiary of Capcom, has its head office in the George House in Hammersmith in the borough. As of May 2011 it will be relocating to the Metro Building in Hammersmith. Iran Air's London offices are also located in the borough. The airline moved there by Wednesday 4 January 2012.Disney and L'Oréal also all have UK headquarters in Hammersmith, as well as a number of other major businesses.

For a 15-year period Air France had its UK and Ireland office in Hammersmith. In 2006 the UK and Ireland office was moved to Hatton Cross, London Borough of Hounslow.

Until 2013, Virgin Group Ltd. had its corporate headquarters at The School House, Brook Green. The office was moved to the Battleship Building, near the Westway in Paddington, in the City of Westminster.

Also, TAP Portugal runs an administrative office in the Borough, near to Hammersmith Bus Station.

Politics

Hammersmith & Fulham is administered by 46 councillors. The Labour Party won control of the borough at the 2014 council elections held on 22 May with 26 councilors to the Conservative Party's 20 councilors, following Conservative control of the council since the 2006 council election. The council leader is Stephen Cowan.

The borough is divided into 16 electoral wards, all bar two electing three councillors apiece. These are:

Addison
Askew
Avonmore & Brook Green
College Park & Old Oak
Fulham Broadway
Fulham Reach
Hammersmith Broadway
Munster
North End
Palace Riverside
Parson's Green & Walham
Ravenscourt Park
Sands End
Shepherd's Bush Green
Town
Wormholt & White City

Former councillors for Hammersmith and Fulham who are current members of parliament include  Greg Hands MP (Con), Lisa Nandy MP (Lab) and Andrew Slaughter MP (Lab).

Sport
The borough has a proud sporting heritage going back to at least the second half of the 19th-century when the fledgeling Amateur Athletic Association of England came to the Lillie Bridge Grounds, followed there by football, boxing and First-class cricket. The borough is home to the world-governing body of Polo at The Hurlingham Club in Fulham and upholds the traditions of racketts and championship tennis at the Queen's Club, also in Fulham.

The borough is home to a number of sports teams and athletes:

Football
Chelsea Football Club is based in the borough and plays Premier League football having won the English national championship on six occasions (1955, 2005, 2006, 2010,  2015 and 2017) as well as the UEFA Champions League in 2012 and 2021. London's oldest professional football club, Fulham F.C. playing in the Premier League and Queens Park Rangers (playing in the Championship) are also based in the borough.

Footballers
 Ex-Nottingham Forest, Newcastle United, West Ham United, Manchester City and England international defender Stuart Pearce was born in Shepherd's Bush.
 Much-travelled former Queens Park Rangers striker Marcus Bent was born in Hammersmith.
 Tony Bedeau of Torquay United and Walsall was born in Hammersmith in 1979.
 Former Queens Park Rangers midfielder Lee Cook was born in Hammersmith in 1984.

Rugby

Hammersmith & Fulham RFC have been playing in the borough at Hurlingham Park for over 30 years. They boast four senior men's sides and one Ladies XV. The men's 1st XV currently compete in London's NE2 League with the remainder of the sides participating in the Middlesex Merit Tables.

Tennis

Public and private courts are available throughout the borough.

Boxing

 Joe Calzaghe was born in Hammersmith in 1972.
 Frank Bruno was born in Hammersmith in 1961.

Rowing

Lower Mall hosted several rowing clubs at the end of the 19th century, of which there are two survivors and one founded slightly later. Among those who moved elsewhere or were disbanded were those in the headquarters of the national governing body, British Rowing, The Priory.

The first half of the Boat Race course, which is known as the Championship Course, hosting hundreds of eights the weekend before and many other races, is on the borough's most obvious boundary: its section of the Tideway – the upper estuary of the Thames.

Transport
The numerous London Overground and London Underground stations in the borough are:
Barons Court tube station
East Acton tube station
Fulham Broadway tube station
Goldhawk Road tube station
Hammersmith tube station (Circle and Hammersmith & City lines)
Hammersmith tube station (District and Piccadilly lines)
Imperial Wharf railway station
Kensington Olympia railway station
Parsons Green tube station
Putney Bridge tube station
Ravenscourt Park tube station
Shepherd's Bush tube station
Shepherd's Bush Market tube station
West Brompton station while the entrance is in RBKC, the West London Line platforms are in the borough.
West Kensington tube station
White City tube station
Wood Lane tube station

The London Overground line now connects the borough with the North London Line via Willesden Junction station and direct services to Watford Junction station to the north and services to East Croydon station to the south, via Clapham Junction railway station.

Two main road arteries, the A4 road and the A40 road cross the borough.
Hammersmith bus station at Hammersmith Broadway, above the District and Piccadilly lines tube station, is an important bus hub to most parts of London.

In March 2011, the main forms of transport that residents used to travel to work were: underground, metro, light rail, tram, 26.8% of all residents aged 16–74; bus, minibus or coach, 8.8%; on foot, 8.8%; driving a car or van, 8.2%; bicycle, 5.1%; work mainly at or from home, 4.2%; train, 3.1%.

Culture

The See of London has occupied the Fulham Palace riverside grounds for close on 900 years. The Palace is leased to the borough since 1977 and is now a museum.

The borough has four theatres (Riverside Studios, Bush Theatre, the Lyric Hammersmith and Curtains Up). LAMDA is based in the borough. There are several cinema complexes. Studio 106 Art Gallery holds regular exhibitions and workshops.

The Lyric Hammersmith, on Lyric Square off King Street, is considered one of the most notable theatres outside the West End in London.

The borough is also home to the Hammersmith Apollo and O2 Shepherd's Bush Empire, which play hosts to major concerts and stand-up comedy performances.

Education

Public libraries in the borough include Askew Road Library, Avonmore Library, Fulham Library, Hammersmith Library, Sands End Library, and Shepherds Bush Library. The Borough Archives, open to the public Mondays and Tuesdays, staffed mainly by volunteers, are accessed in Hammersmith Library.

The borough is the home of an 1893 establishment, the Sacred Heart High School, Hammersmith on Hammersmith Broadway, and of Lady Margaret School (LMS) on Parsons Green, a school that welcomes girls of all academic abilities aged 11–17 years. It has been at the forefront of girls' education for over 95 years and has its origins in Whitelands College School which was founded in 1842. When that school was threatened with closure Lady Margaret was established in September 1917 by the redoubtable Miss Enid Moberly Bell. The borough is also home to two prestigious independent girls' schools – St Paul's Girls' School in Brook Green (often ranked in first place in the country in league tables, with nearly 50% of each year group gaining entry to Oxbridge), and the Godolphin and Latymer School, situated a few minutes' walk from Hammersmith Broadway.

The London Oratory School is a leading Roman Catholic secondary school in East Fulham.

Latymer Upper School, an independent co-educational school, is also in the borough, on King Street in Hammersmith.

The exclusive independent girls' preparatory school Bute House is also in Brook Green.
There are two notable independent French language primary schools: Ecole Jacques Prevert in Brook Green and the Ecole Marie d'Orliac in Hurlingham.

See also

 Hammersmith and Fulham parks and open spaces
 The "Hammersmith Apollo"
Hammersmith and Fulham (UK Parliament constituency)
History of Shepherd's Bush
Tri-borough shared services

Twinned towns
The London Borough of Hammersmith and Fulham has formal twinning arrangements with:
 Anderlecht, Belgium
 Boulogne-Billancourt, France
 Neukölln, Germany.  The twinning is commemorated by a former German street lamp from West Berlin that now stands on Hammersmith Riverside, in Furnival Gardens, and was given by Willy Brandt when he was Mayor of West Berlin in 1963.

Below it is a plaque which reads:

Freedom of the Borough
The following people and military units have received the Freedom of the Borough of Hammersmith and Fulham.

Individuals
 George Cohen : 19 October 2016.

Military Units
 Headquarters Squadron 31 Signal Regiment (Volunteers): 1981.
 The Royal Yeomanry: 26 January 2011.

References

External links 

 
 Open data about Hammersmith & Fulham from OpenlyLocal

 
Hammersmith and Fulham
Hammersmith and Fulham
1965 establishments in the United Kingdom